Justin Eric Vom Steeg (born April 5, 1997) is an American soccer player.

Career

College & Amateur
Vom Steeg played college soccer at the University of California, Santa Barbara in 2015. While at UC Santa Barbara, Vom Steeg played with Premier Development League side Ventura County Fusion.

Professional
On August 23, 2016, Vom Steeg signed for 2. Bundesliga side Fortuna Düsseldorf. After a season in Germany, Vom Steeg moved back to the United States when he signed with United Soccer League side LA Galaxy II on September 8, 2017.

On March 1, 2018 it was announced that Vom Steeg had moved up to LA Galaxy. Following the 2021 season, Vom Steeg was released by LA Galaxy.

On January 25, 2022, Vom Steeg was signed by Portland Timbers. Following the 2022 season, his contract option was declined by Portland.

Personal
Justin is the son of Tim Vom Steeg, who is currently head coach of the UC Santa Barbara Gauchos soccer team. He has three younger brothers, Carson, who plays for Loudoun United FC, and twin brothers Jared and Caden, who play collegiately for UC Santa Barbara.

References

External links 
 
 

1997 births
Living people
American soccer players
Association football goalkeepers
Fortuna Düsseldorf players
LA Galaxy II players
LA Galaxy players
Portland Timbers players
Soccer players from California
Sportspeople from Santa Barbara, California
UC Santa Barbara Gauchos men's soccer players
USL League Two players
USL Championship players
United States men's under-20 international soccer players
United States men's youth international soccer players
Ventura County Fusion players
Portland Timbers 2 players
MLS Next Pro players